Century is a 1999 coffee table book published by Phaidon Press that is equal parts photography and history.  In the words of the author, Century is "an attempt to outline the history of the twentieth century as the camera has seen it."

The book was both conceived and edited by Bruce Bernard (1928–2000), a picture editor for The Sunday Times Magazine and a number of books on art and photography, including Photodiscovery.   He curated 100 Photographs at the Victoria and Albert Museum.   A book of which was published by Phaidon. An expanded edition was made after Bernard's death showing pictures from 1999 to 2001

References

External links
Phaidon Press:  about the book

1999 books
Photographic collections and books
Photographic history books
20th-century history books
History books about the 20th century
Coffee table books